The men's 400 metres event was part of the track and field athletics programme at the 1920 Summer Olympics. The competition was held on Thursday, August 19, 1920, and on Friday, August 20, 1920. 37 runners from 16 nations competed. No nation had more than 4 runners, suggesting the limit had been reduced from the 12 maximum in force in 1908 and 1912. The event was won by Bevil Rudd of South Africa, the nation's first title (and first medal) in the event. Nils Engdahl's bronze was Sweden's first medal in the 400 metres.

Background

This was the sixth appearance of the event, which is one of 12 athletics events to have been held at every Summer Olympics. The only returning finalist from the pre-war 1912 Games was Ted Meredith of the United States, who had finished 4th in Stockholm and who had broken the world record in 1916. Other favored entrants included 1919 AAU champion Frank Shea of the United States, 1919 AAA champion Guy Butler of Great Britain, and 1920 AAA champion Bevil Rudd of South Africa.

Czechoslovakia, Egypt, Estonia, Finland, India, Luxembourg, and Spain appeared in the event for the first time. The United States made its sixth appearance in the event, the only nation to compete in it at every Olympic Games to that point.

Competition format

Despite the smaller field than 1912 (37 athletes, down from 49), the competition expanded from three rounds to four. The first round had 10 heats, with 3 or 4 runners each. The top two runners in each heat advanced to the quarterfinals. There were 4 quarterfinals, with 5 runners in each; the top three athletes in each heat advanced to the semifinals. The semifinals featured 2 heats of 6 runners each. Again, the top three runners in each semifinal heat advanced, making a six-man final.

Records

These were the standing world and Olympic records (in seconds) prior to the 1920 Summer Olympics.

(*) 440 yards (= 402.34 m)

No records were set during this event.

Schedule

Results
Times were generally only published for the winners of each heat. Some of the times listed below are estimates based on contemporary reports of the races.

Round 1

Heat 1

Heat 2

Heat 3

Heat 4

Heat 5

a.Reinhold Saulmann's time is given as 52.2 by contemporary Estonian reports.

Heat 6

Heat 7

Heat 8

Heat 9

Heat 10

Quarterfinals

Quarterfinal 1

Quarterfinal 2

Quarterfinal 3

Quarterfinal 4

Semifinals

Semifinal 1

Semifinal 2

Final

References

Further reading
 
 

400 metres
400 metres at the Olympics